Kleine Pyra is a river of Saxony, Germany. It is a right tributary of the Zwickauer Mulde, which it joins near Tannenbergsthal.

See also
List of rivers of Saxony

Rivers of Saxony
Rivers of the Ore Mountains
Rivers of Germany